TV10 (TV tio) is a television channel owned by Viaplay Group broadcasting to Sweden. It specializes in sports and documentaries. The channel started broadcasting on 7 September 2010.

Until the start, the channel is available from several operators such as Boxer, Comhem, Telia, Tele2 and Viasat. From the beginning, the channel took over all sporting events from Viasat's other TV channels. In 2011, however, TV3 and TV6 again began broadcasting sports. Among other things, TV10 is supposed to broadcast American football from the NFL, basketball, boxing and UEFA Champions League.

Receiving 
The audience was strongly critical when it was decided that TV10 would broadcast the Sweden–San Marino match because 70% of households have access to the channel, while sister channels TV3 and TV6 take up 85% of households.

External links

References

Modern Times Group
Television channels in Sweden
Television channels and stations established in 2010
2010 establishments in Sweden
Television channel articles with incorrect naming style